This is a list of films which placed number one at the weekend box office for the year 2014 in the Philippines.

*Local film

Total gross

*Local Film

References

 

Philippines
2014
Number